Franklyn Seales (July 15, 1952 – May 14, 1990) was an American film, television and stage actor.  He was known for his portrayals of business manager Dexter Stuffins in the 1980s sitcom Silver Spoons, and real-life convicted cop killer Jimmy Lee (Youngblood) Smith in the 1979 film The Onion Field.

Early life and education
Franklyn Vincent Ellison Seales  was born on July 15, 1952, the fifth eldest of eight siblings, in Calliaqua to Francis Seales, a merchant seaman and government employee, and Olive Seales (née Allen), a homemaker. Seales was of English, Scottish, African, Portuguese and Native Caribbean descent.  He and his family left the West Indies in 1960 and settled in New York City. He attended Lincoln High School in Brooklyn.

Seales originally intended to study at the Pratt Institute to pursue a career in art. However, in the early 1970s, Seales agreed to accompany an aspiring-actress friend to an audition at the Juilliard School. As Seales helped his friend run through the famous Romeo and Juliet balcony scene, actor/producer John Houseman (then director and founder of the school's drama division) began to notice him. Houseman offered Seales a four-year Juilliard scholarship. Seales was the first and only known graduate of Juilliard to hail from St. Vincent. He studied at Houseman's Acting Company.

Career
Seales made his breakthrough in 1978 with the PBS drama, Trial of the Moke, portraying Lt. Henry O. Flipper, the first African-American graduate of West Point. He went on to appear in The Onion Field (1979), in which he portrayed real-life convicted cop killer Jimmy Lee (Youngblood) Smith. That same year, he also had a minor role in Star Trek: The Motion Picture. He appeared in the 1981 film, Southern Comfort, in which he portrayed Rifleman Cleotis Simms.

He came to do other television and became a regular on Silver Spoons (which also starred Houseman), a situation comedy of the early 1980s in which he portrayed Dexter Stuffins from 1983 to 1987. He appeared on episodes of Hill Street Blues and Amen.

In Los Angeles, Seales joined L.A. Theatre Works and was seen in such unconventional productions as Conversation at Night With a Despised Character, in which Los Angeles Times critic Lawrence Christon found him "one of America's most compelling stage actors."

He was the Last Person on Earth in Sade-Sack, or How to Live After the Asprocalisp, and he starred in Bertolt Brecht's The Caucasian Chalk Circle. Working primarily in the experimental Equity Waiver theaters of L.A.'s Westside, Seales was seen in No Place to Be Somebody, as "Hamlet" in the Charles Marowitz drama, in Babbitt and Oh Dad Poor Dad.

Despite his talent some of the roles he most wanted sometimes eluded him.  "Either I'm not black enough or I look too Hispanic or Cuban", he said in one of his last interviews in 1988. "I have to be hired by someone who knows my work." His last major triumph was at the Mark Taper Forum in October 1988, in Nothing Sacred, an adaptation of Ivan Turgenev's novel Fathers and Sons. Along with acting, Seales was a painter.

Personal life and death
According to Walter Hill, the director of Southern Comfort, Seales was gay.

Franklyn Seales started noticing symptoms of AIDS related illness (in particular a persistent cough) on the set of Amen and had been unable to work regularly for the last couple years of his life.

On May 14, 1990, Seales died at the age of 37 from complications of AIDS at his family's home in Brooklyn. He was cremated and his ashes were scattered in the Caribbean Sea.

Filmography

References

External links

 

 Jean Dorsinville interview on Franklyn Seales biography on YouTube

1952 births
1990 deaths
20th-century American male actors
AIDS-related deaths in New York (state)
Abraham Lincoln High School (Brooklyn) alumni
African-American male actors
African-American artists
American male film actors
American male stage actors
American male television actors
American people of English descent
American people of Portuguese descent
American people of Scottish descent
American gay actors
Juilliard School alumni
LGBT African Americans
People from Saint George Parish, Saint Vincent and the Grenadines
Saint Vincent and the Grenadines emigrants to the United States
20th-century African-American people
20th-century American LGBT people